Cycloramphus mirandaribeiroi is a species of frog in the family Cycloramphidae.
It is endemic to Brazil.
Its natural habitats are subtropical or tropical moist lowland forests and rivers. Its population is in decline.

References

References

mirandaribeiroi
Endemic fauna of Brazil
Taxonomy articles created by Polbot
Amphibians described in 1983